Fidelis Education is a San Francisco-based tech startup company. The company's goal is to launch a new category of educational technology called Learning Relationship Management (LRM). Founded by a former US Marine and a Harvard Business School graduate, Gunnar Counselman, Fidelis Education focuses on helping universities scale and manage relationships between students, coaches, faculty, and mentors.

Fidelis belongs to a loosely defined software and services industry that encompasses a diverse array of companies, offering a range of services to various types of non-profit post-secondary institutions.

Technology
The company is developing cloud-based software platform that allows users to manage personal and professional goals from matriculation, through graduation, and continuing into their careers. The platform allows each student to connect with a professional coach and a team of mentors who provide advice and encouragement through the entire process. The company currently partners with Arizona State Online, American Public University, and Stanford University.

Funding
Fidelis is funded entirely through venture capital. The first round of funding raised $2.5 million from Accel and Novak Biddle, a firm that specializes in education startups.

References

Technology companies of the United States
Companies based in San Francisco